Antananadava or Antanandava is a town and commune in Madagascar. It belongs to the district of Mandritsara, which is a part of Sofia Region. The population of the commune was estimated to be approximately 11,000 in 2001 commune census.

Only primary schooling is available. The majority 95.75% of the population of the commune are farmers, while an additional 4% receives their livelihood from raising livestock. The most important crop is rice, while other important products are peanuts, maize and cassava.  Additionally, fishing employs 0.25% of the population.

References and notes 

Populated places in Sofia Region